Lakhsh is a jamoat in Tajikistan. It is located in Lakhsh District in Districts of Republican Subordination region. The jamoat has a total population of 4,938 (2015). It consists of 3 villages: Chorsu (formerly: Jayilgan), Kayondeh and Safeddara.

References

Populated places in Districts of Republican Subordination
Jamoats of Tajikistan